The Rolls-Royce Trent 900 is a high-bypass turbofan produced by Rolls-Royce plc to power the Airbus A380, competing with the Engine Alliance GP7000.

Initially proposed for the Boeing 747-500/600X in July 1996,
this first application was later abandoned but it was offered for the A3XX,
launched as the A380 in December 2000.
It first ran on 18 March 2003,
made its maiden flight on 17 May 2004 on an A340 testbed,
and was certified by the EASA on 29 October 2004.

Producing up to 374 kN (84,000 lbf), the Trent 900 has the three shaft architecture of the Rolls-Royce Trent family with a  fan.
It has a 8.5-8.7:1 bypass ratio and a 37–39:1 overall pressure ratio.

Development

In July 1996, Rolls-Royce offered the Trent 900 for the proposed Boeing 747-500/600X, targeting a 2000 service entry and competing with the General Electric/Pratt & Whitney Engine Alliance.
With a scaled-down Trent 800 core and a similar  fan, increasing bypass ratio from 6.5 to 8.5, the  engine could also power the Airbus A3XX.
The $450 million development aimed for a December 1999 certification but the 747X was later abandoned, leaving the A3XX, its Airbus competitor, as a possible application from 2003.

By July 2000, the Trent 900 was the first engine to be ordered for the A3XX, by then with a swept fan.
The A3XX was launched as the A380 on 19 December 2000.
It was then selected by Singapore Airlines and Virgin Atlantic over the competing GP7200.
Its  fan comes from the Trent 8104 demonstrator, and a contra-rotating HP spool is used for the first time, for up to 2% better efficiency.

The Trent 900 made its maiden flight on 17 May 2004 on Airbus' A340-300 testbed, replacing the port inner CFM56 engine. Its final certification was granted by the EASA on 29 October 2004, and the FAA on 4 December 2006. After a twelve-month suspension caused by delays to the A380, Rolls-Royce announced in October 2007 that production of the Trent 900 had been restarted. On 27 September 2007, British Airways announced the selection of the Trent 900 to power 12 A380 aircraft, helping to take the engine's share of the A380 engine market to 52% at the end of February 2009.

Design
The Trent 900 is an axial flow, high bypass turbofan with the three coaxial shafts of the Rolls-Royce Trent family.
The  fan with swept blades is driven by a 5-stage LP turbine, the 8-stage IP compressor and the 6-stage HP compressor are both powered by a single stage turbine, with the HP spool rotating in the opposite direction of the others.
It has a single annular combustor and is controlled by an EEC.
It is certified for thrusts between 334.29 and 374.09 kN (75,152 to 84,098 lbf).

Its swept-back fan is inherited from the Trent 8104 demonstrator and a contra-rotating HP spool is used for the first time.
It features a scaled-down Trent 800 core.
It can be transported on a Boeing 747 freighter whole, the only A380 engine capable of.
The swept-back fan is 15% lighter than previous wide-chord blades.

Rolls-Royce has seven risk and revenue sharing partners on the Trent 900: Industria de Turbo Propulsores (low-pressure turbine), Hamilton Sundstrand (electronic engine controls), Avio S.p.A. (gearbox module), Marubeni Corporation (engine components), Volvo Aero (intermediate compressor case), Goodrich Corporation (fan casings and sensors) and Honeywell (pneumatic systems). In addition, Samsung Techwin, Kawasaki Heavy Industries and Ishikawajima-Harima Heavy Industries (IHI) are programme associates.

Variants

Upgrades

The Trent 900 family of engines had their first set of upgrades marketed as the Trent 900EP; these were available for delivery from 2012. This package delivered a 1% saving on fuel burn compared to non EP engines. Rolls-Royce told Aviation Week and Space Technology that the upgrades were intended in most cases for both new engines and as retrofits. This upgrade is based on advancements made during the development of the Trent XWB for the Airbus A350 XWB and matches improvements made for the Trent 700 called the Trent 700EP. Block 1 includes elliptical leading edges in the compressor, smaller low-pressure turbine tip clearances, and new coating for the high-pressure compressor drum, as well as an upgrade to the engine control (FADEC) software.

The EP2 package entered testing in May 2013 and was scheduled to be available for delivery in mid 2014. This package aims to provide a further 0.8% reduction in fuel burn on top of the improvements offered by the EP package. Changes include better sealing of the low-pressure turbine, improvements to fan blade tip clearances, and other changes derived from the engines developed for the Boeing 787 and Airbus A350.
EP2 passed a type certificate test by European Aviation Safety Agency on 27 November 2013 and an update type certificate was issued on 11 December 2013.

Applications
 Airbus A380

Operational history

Qantas QF32 uncontained engine failure

Cost
In 2000 Qantas were quoted a price of US$12.85 million per Trent 900. In 2015 Emirates Airlines signed a contract for 200 Trent 900s including long-term service support at a cost of US$9.2 billion or US$ million per engine.
In 2016 ANA bought engines for three new Airbus A380 aircraft for $300m: $m per Trent 900.
A new set of LLPs is worth $7 million and an overhaul costs slightly more.

Engines on display
Trent 900s are on display at LeBourget Air Museum (Paris, France), Seville University (Seville, Spain), and the Málaga Aeronautical Museum (Málaga, Spain).

Specifications (Trent 900)

See also

References

External links

 
 

Trent 900
High-bypass turbofan engines
2000s turbofan engines
2004 introductions

de:Rolls-Royce Trent#Trent 900